Ramakant Yadav may refer to:

 Ramakant Yadav (politician) (born 1957), Indian politician
 Ramakant Yadav (neurologist), (born in 1968) professor of neurology